The  Kitty Hawk-class supercarriers of the United States Navy were an incremental improvement on the  vessels. All are now decommissioned.

Improved Forrestal carriers
The biggest differences from the Forrestals are greater length, and a different placement of elevators; two are forward of the island, one is aft of the island and another on the portside stern. The movement of the No. 4 elevator from the forward to the after end of the angle made it useful for aircraft movement, since the forward-end elevator in the Forrestals was sited in both the landing path and in the launch path of the waist catapults.

Three different shipyards were used to construct the ships. Kitty Hawk was built at New York Shipbuilding Corporation, Constellation at New York Naval Shipyard, America and John F. Kennedy at Newport News Shipbuilding. John F. Kennedy is similar to the earlier units in flightdeck arrangement and propulsion, but has enough differences that she is placed in her own class. Propulsion consisted of four Westinghouse geared turbines, four shafts with eight  Foster Wheeler boilers.

Construction and design differences
The initial design for the class was known as SCB 127, and Kitty Hawk and Constellation were completed to design SCB 127A.

The first three units were constructed with a Terrier surface-to-air missile system. The supporting missile launchers and AN/SPG-55 radars consumed a large amount of space, while at the same time duplicating the capabilities of the air defence escorts, and were later removed. John F. Kennedy did not have Terrier and was built with the shorter ranged Sea Sparrow, Basic Point Defense Missile System (BPDMS). All were eventually equipped with NATO Sea Sparrow (NSSM) and Phalanx CIWS for self-defense. In 2001, Kitty Hawk received two Rolling Airframe Missile launchers replacing the forward Sea Sparrow and Phalanx CIWS equipment. The SLQ-32 Electronic Warfare Suite was added as part of the Service Life Extension Program (SLEP) on Kitty Hawk and Constellation.

America was designed under project SCB 127B and so had several differences from the lead units of the class. Instead of two forward anchors, one on each side, America had no port side anchor and an additional anchor astern, a change made to accommodate the AN/SQS-23 sonar. America was the only post-World War II U.S. carrier to be built with sonar, which was however removed in the early 1980s. She also had a narrow smokestack compared to prior units.

John F. Kennedy class
 was originally scheduled to be the fourth Kitty Hawk-class carrier, but because she received so many modifications under project SCB 127C, she formed her own ship class and is often listed as a single-vessel class. Kennedy had similar design changes regarding the anchors to accommodate a sonar array, but the sonar was never installed. There was also a proposal to make her nuclear powered under competing project SCB 211A, but since Congress would not authorize it, Kennedy was constructed as a conventionally powered carrier. Her smokestack is also different and tilts outboard to send stack gas away from the flight deck. Kennedy is also  shorter in length than the other Kitty Hawk-class carriers.

Decommissioning
From 1987 to 1991 Kitty Hawk was overhauled for $785 million under the Service Life Extension Program (SLEP) at Philadelphia Naval Shipyard. From 1990 to 1992, Constellation received her $800 million service life extension also in Philadelphia. The program was intended to add 15 years to the life of the ships. John F. Kennedy was not overhauled as part of SLEP. Instead, from 1993 to 1995, she received a $491 million overhaul.  It was the final project of Philadelphia Naval Shipyard prior to its closing. America had been scheduled to be overhauled under the service life extension program after Constellation, but she was decommissioned 9 August 1996 instead, during a time of budget cuts after the Cold War. America was in very poor condition when she was decommissioned, and therefore despite her historical significance was not held as a donation asset. She was expended as a live-fire target and sunk on 14 May 2005.

Constellation was decommissioned 7 August 2003. John F. Kennedy was decommissioned on 23 March 2007. Kitty Hawk returned to the United States after the turnover. She was decommissioned on 12 May 2009.

Ships in class

Gallery

References

External links

Federation of American Scientists – Kitty Hawk Class

Aircraft carrier classes
 
 Kitty Hawk-class aircraft carriers
 Kitty Hawk-class aircraft carriers